The 2008 Men's European Water Polo Championship was the 28th edition of the bi-annual event, organised by the Europe's governing body in aquatics, the Ligue Européenne de Natation. The event took place in the Aquatic Centre Málaga in Málaga, Spain from July 4 to July 13, 2008. The gold medal was won by Montenegro, the silver medal by Serbia and the bronze medal by Hungary.

Teams

GROUP A

GROUP B

Preliminary round

Group A

July 4, 2008

July 5, 2008

July 6, 2008

July 7, 2008

July 8, 2008

Group B

July 4, 2008

July 5, 2008

July 6, 2008

July 7, 2008

July 8, 2008

Final round

Places 7/12
July 9, 2008

July 11, 2008

Places 11 / 12
July 11, 2008

Places 9 / 10
July 12, 2008

Places 7 / 8
July 12, 2008

Quarterfinals
July 9, 2008

Semifinals
July 11, 2008

Finals

Places 5 / 6
July 12, 2008

Bronze Medal
July 13, 2008

Gold Medal
July 13, 2008 – Malaga, Spain

Final ranking

Individual awards
Most Valuable Player

Best Goalkeeper

Topscorer
 (23)

References
 Official site
 LEN website

Men
Men's European Water Polo Championship
International water polo competitions hosted by Spain
E
W